Bryaninops (commonly known as sea whip gobies) is a tropical Indo-Pacific genus of gobies. The genus takes its common name from the fact that it is commensal on gorgonians (commonly known as sea whips) and black coral. The genus is further characterised by cryptic colouration.

Species
There are currently 16 recognized species in this genus:
 Bryaninops amplus Larson, 1985 (Large whip goby)
 Bryaninops annella T. Suzuki & J. E. Randall, 2014 
 Bryaninops dianneae Larson, 1985
 Bryaninops discus T. Suzuki, Bogorodsky & J. E. Randall, 2012
 Bryaninops earlei T. Suzuki & J. E. Randall, 2014 
 Bryaninops erythrops D. S. Jordan & Seale, 1906 (Erythrops goby)
 Bryaninops isis Larson, 1985 (Isis goby)
 Bryaninops loki Larson, 1985 (Loki whip-goby)
 Bryaninops natans Larson, 1985 (Redeye goby)
 Bryaninops nexus Larson, 1987 (Upside-down goby)
 Bryaninops ridens J. L. B. Smith, 1959 (Ridens goby)
 Bryaninops spongicolus T. Suzuki, Bogorodsky & J. E. Randall, 2012
 Bryaninops tectus T. Suzuki & J. E. Randall, 2014 
 Bryaninops tigris Larson, 1985 (Black coral goby)
 Bryaninops translucens T. Suzuki & J. E. Randall, 2014 
 Bryaninops yongei W. P. Davis & Cohen, 1969 (Whip coral goby)

References

 
Fish of the Pacific Ocean
Fish of the Indian Ocean
Gobiinae